Esteban Carril Caso (born 24 May 1977) is a Spanish tennis coach and former professional player.

Playing career
A native of Gijón, Carril was a three-time All-American varsity player at Texas Christian University. On the professional tour he made his only ATP Tour main draw appearance in the doubles of the 2005 Estoril Open, reaching the quarter-finals. Most of his tour matches were on the ITF Futures circuit, where he won one singles and nine doubles titles.

Coaching
Carril's coaching career has been highlighted by his three years with Johanna Konta, who he took from around 100 in the world to an Australian Open semi-final and top 10 ranking, before departing in 2016. He had a trial period as coach of Emma Raducanu in late 2021 and was then announced to have joined fellow Brit Andy Murray's coaching team for the Stockholm Open.

ITF Futures titles

Singles: (1)

Doubles: (9)

References

External links
 
 

1977 births
Living people
Spanish male tennis players
Spanish tennis coaches
TCU Horned Frogs men's tennis players
Sportspeople from Gijón
Tennis players from Asturias